The AFC Futsal Club Championship  is the current highest Asian futsal club competition, hosted by the Asian Football Confederation. It is futsal equivalent to AFC Champions League.

For the inaugural edition, AFC Futsal Committee decided to make it an invitational event, and each member association has been asked to nominate their national league champions for the tournament.

History and format
A trial edition, named 2006 Asia Futsal Cup, was run in 2006 with six teams participating. Iranian team Shensa Saveh beat Uzbek Ardus FC 5–1 in the final.
The first recognised edition by the AFC was held in 2010 and ran with ten teams, forming two groups of five teams. The top two finishers then proceeded to the semi-finals. Since 2015 the final tournament is played with 12 teams. If more national league champions wish to enter a team, all but the top three finishers of the last tournament and the host nation, have to enter a qualification stage.

Summaries

Participating associations by debut

Records and statistics

Medals by nation

Winners by club

Performance by country

Awards

Most Valuable Players

Top scorers

AFC Fair Play Award

See also
 AFC Futsal Club Championship records and statistics
 AFC Futsal Asian Cup

References

External links
 Official website

 
International club futsal competitions
Futsal
Futsal competitions in Asia
2010 establishments in Asia
Recurring sporting events established in 2010
Multi-national professional sports leagues